Kenneth Zaret is an American biologist, currently Joseph Leidy Professor at University of Pennsylvania and an Elected Fellow of the American Association for the Advancement of Science.

Zaret's lab discovered pioneer factors.

References

Year of birth missing (living people)
Living people
Fellows of the American Association for the Advancement of Science
21st-century American biologists
University of Rochester alumni
 University of Pennsylvania faculty